Alen Peternac (born 16 January 1972) is a Croatian former professional footballer who played as a striker, and works as an assistant head coach of Croatian First Football League club Dinamo Zagreb.

He is best known for his Real Valladolid stint, spending the better part of his professional career in Spain, appearing in 206 official games in representation of three clubs.

Club career
Peternac was born in Zagreb, Socialist Federative Republic of Yugoslavia. In 1989, he started his football career at hometown NK Dinamo Zagreb, and played six years for Dinamo and HNK Segesta in the Croatian league before moving to Spain.

Peternac spent five seasons at Real Valladolid, appearing in 171 competitive games and becoming the team's all-time top goalscorer in La Liga. His goal total also made him the second-highest Croatian goalscorer in the competition, behind Sevilla FC and Real Madrid's Davor Šuker.

On 19 May 1996, in an 8–3 away win against Real Oviedo which proved crucial in helping Valladolid avoid direct relegation in 1995–96, Peternac set a club record by netting five times, four of which on penalty kicks. He finished that campaign as the fourth top goalscorer, with 23 goals.

For 2000–01, Peternac joined Real Zaragoza, receiving limited playing time. He was then loaned to Real Murcia, where he played one season in the second division before closing out his career back with the Aragonese (one match, followed by retirement due to injuries).

International career
Peternac earned his first cap for Croatia on 10 February 1999 against Denmark, in a friendly played in Split which Croatia lost 1–0. Exactly one month after he appeared in another exhibition game, a 3–2 loss against Greece; incidentally, he was replaced by Goran Vlaović in his two appearances, at half-time.

Managerial career
On 22 April 2020, following the appointment of Igor Jovićević as Dinamo Zagreb manager, Peternac was named his assistant.

References

External links
 

1972 births
Living people
Footballers from Zagreb
Association football forwards
Yugoslav footballers
Croatian footballers
Croatia international footballers
GNK Dinamo Zagreb players
HNK Segesta players
Real Valladolid players
Real Zaragoza players
Real Murcia players
Yugoslav First League players
Croatian Football League players
La Liga players
Segunda División players
Croatian expatriate footballers
Expatriate footballers in Spain
Croatian expatriate sportspeople in Spain
GNK Dinamo Zagreb non-playing staff